Brymon European Airways was an airline formed in November 1992 by the merger of Birmingham European Airways and Brymon Airways. The latter were the original operators of the Dash 7 aircraft in the UK and conducted the trials of the type at the embryonic London City Airport.

The merger was short-lived. In 1993, Brymon European was again split up. The Brymon operations were purchased by British Airways (Brymon) and the former Birmingham European operations were purchased by Maersk Air to create Maersk Air UK Ltd.

External links
 History of Duo Airways and its predecessors 
 Defunct airlines

Defunct airlines of the United Kingdom
Airlines established in 1992
Airlines disestablished in 1993